Wetmore House may refer to:

Wetmore House (Piedmont, California), listed on the National Register of Historic Places in Alameda County, California
Seth Wetmore House, Middletown, Connecticut, listed on the National Register of Historic Places in Middlesex County, Connecticut
Wetmore House (Warren, Pennsylvania), listed on the National Register of Historic Places in Warren County, Pennsylvania